Agnes Jane Robertson M.A. PhD (1893-1959) was a historian of Anglo-Saxon England. She was a student of Hector Munro Chadwick in the Department of Anglo-Saxon and Kindred Studies at the University of Cambridge, matriculating in about 1918. She was a Pfeiffer Research Fellow of Girton College, Cambridge and a lecturer in the Department of Anglo-Saxon and Kindred Studies between 1932 and 1935. She was later a reader in English language at the University of Aberdeen, which gives the Agnes Jane Robertson Memorial Lecture in her honour.

Robertson edited and translated two volumes of Anglo-Saxon documents, The Laws of the Kings of England from Edmund to Henry I, published in 1925, and Anglo-Saxon Charters, in 1939, with a second edition in 1956. A facsimile reprint was published in 2009.

References

Alumni of Girton College, Cambridge
Fellows of Girton College, Cambridge
20th-century English historians
British women historians
20th-century women writers
Anglo-Saxon studies scholars
1893 births
1959 deaths